Pachycrocuta is an extinct genus of prehistoric hyenas. Pachycrocuta first appeared during the late Miocene (Messinian, 7.2 to 5.3 million years ago). By 800,000 years ago, it became locally extinct in Europe and became completely extinct during the middle Pleistocene, 400,000 years ago.

Taxonomy
The first identified fossil of the short-faced hyena was discovered in Le Puy, Auvergne, France, in 1845 by French paleontologist Auguste Aymard. In 1850, French paleontologist Paul Gervais made it the holotype specimen of a new species, Hyaena brevirostris. But, in 1893, while writing a much more detailed description, French paleontologist Marcellin Boule mistakingly listed Aymard as the species authority instead of Gervais, citing volume 12 of Aymard's Annales de la Société d'Agriculture, Sciences, Arts et Commerce du Puy which does not mention the species at all. Boule further gave the annal's publication date as 1846 instead of the correct 1848. The fallacious authority Aymard, 1846, was reprinted for over a century until Spanish paleontologist David M. Alba and colleagues on behalf of the International Code of Zoological Nomenclature convincingly falsified it in 2013.

The short-faced hyena was usually relegated to the genus Hyaena alongside the modern striped hyena and brown hyena. In 1938, Hungarian paleontologist Miklós Kretzoi suggested erecting a new genus for it, Pachycrocuta, but this only became popular after Giovanni Ficcarelli and Danilo Torres' review of hyena classification in 1970. They, like many priors, placed Pachycrocuta as ancestral to Crocuta (the modern spotted hyena).

Dozens more short-faced hyena remains have been found across Europe. In 1828, Jean-Baptiste Croizet and Antoine Claude Gabriel Jobert created the species "H. perrieri" for a specimen from Montagne de Perrier, France. In 1889, German paleontologist Karl Weithofer described "H. robusta" based on a specimen from Olivola, Tuscany, Italy, but Boule quickly synonymized it with "H." brevirostris in 1893. In 1890, French paleontologist Charles Depéret erected "H. pyrenaica" based on a specimen from Roussillon. Short-faced hyenas were also being discovered in East Asia. In 1870, English naturalist Richard Owen described a Chinese specimen as "H." sinensis. In 1908, French paleoanthropologist Eugène Dubois described a Javan one as "H. bathygnatha". In 1934, Chinese paleoanthropologist Pei Wenzhong described another Chinese one, "H." licenti, from the Nihewan Basin. In 1954, mammalogist R. F. Ewer described "P." bellax" from Kromdraai, South Africa. In 1956, Finnish paleontologist Björn Kurtén identified the subspecies "H. b. neglecta" from Jammu, India (he also chose to classify several other short-faced hyenas as subspecies of brevirostris.) In 1970 Ficcarelli and Torres relegated these to Pachycrocuta, though "P. perrieri" is sometimes split off into a different genus, Pliocrocuta, erected by Kretzoi in 1938. In 2001, P. brevirostris was identified in Gladysvale Cave, South Africa.

Usually, no more than one or two Asian short-faced hyenas were considered distinct from the European P. brevirostris. The two species convention was especially popular among Chinese scientists. As the 20th century progressed, they were often classified as regional subspecies of P. brevirostris, with P. b. brevirostris endemic to Europe, and P. b. licenti and P. b. sinensis to China. In 2021, Chinese paleontologist Liu Jinyi and colleagues reported the largest ever short-faced hyena skull from Jinniushan, Northeast China, belonging to P. b. brevirostris, demonstrating the subspecies is not endemic to Europe. They suggested P. b. licenti (Middle Villafranchian) evolved into P. b. brevirostris (Late Villafranchian), which evolved into P. b. sinensis (Galerian). Relict populations of P. b. licenti seem to have persisted for some time in southern China while P. b. brevirostris had replaced most other populations. Liu and colleagues were unsure how other supposed subspecies fit into this paradigm.

Fossils
The oldest specimens of Pachycrocuta were found in the late Miocene of Baringo County (Kenya). Fossil remains have been found broadly in Eurasia and southern and eastern Africa. Most material consists of fragmented remains, usually of the skull, but a cache of very comprehensive bone material was unearthed at the famous Zhoukoudian site, which probably represents the remains of animals using these caves as lairs for many millennia. At the western end of their former range, at Venta Micena in southeastern Spain, a huge assemblage of Pleistocene fossils also represents a den.

Other proposed species, P. robusta and P. pyrenaica, are less well researched; the former may simply be an exceptionally large European paleosubspecies of the brown hyena (Parahyaena brunnea). Sometimes included in this genus (as Pachycrocuta bellax) is the extinct giant striped hyaena, Hyaena bellax.

Behaviour
Similar to the modern day striped hyena, it was probably primarily a kleptoparasitic scavenger of the kills of other predators, such as sabertooth cats. Pachycrocuta scavenged for food, probably preferentially so, because it was a heavyset animal not built for chasing prey over long distances. In this respect it would have differed from the spotted hyena of today, which is a more nimble animal that, contrary to its image as a scavenger, usually kills its own food, but often gets displaced by lions. Apparently it was ecologically close enough to its smaller (but still large) relative Pliocrocuta perrieri that they are never found as contemporary fossils in the same region. Research by anthropologists Noel Boaz and Russell Ciochon on remains of Homo erectus unearthed alongside Pachycrocuta at the Zhoukoudian site attributed scoring and puncture patterns observed on hominin long bones and skulls—originally thought to be signs of cannibalism—to predation by Pachycrocuta.

It has been proposed that Pachycrocuta was outcompeted and driven to extinction by the spotted hyena, which was formerly present in Eurasia as well as Africa. Other predators, such as lions, cave lions, tigers, and wolves, could have put pressure on Pachycrocuta.

See also 
Cave hyena (Crocuta crocuta spelaea)

Notes

References 
 Raoul J. Mutter, Lee R. Berger, Peter Schmid. 2001. New evidence of the giant hyena, Pachycrocuta brevirostris (Carnivora, Hyaenidaae), from the Gladyslave cave deposit (Plio-Pleistocene, John Nash Nature Reserve, Gauteng, South Africa). Palaeont. afr., 37, 103-113

Prehistoric hyenas
Pliocene carnivorans
Pleistocene carnivorans
Pleistocene genus extinctions
Cenozoic mammals of Africa
Fossils of China
Cenozoic mammals of Asia
Cenozoic mammals of Europe
Prehistoric carnivoran genera
Pliocene first appearances